Baynton  is a locality in central Victoria, Australia. Agriculturally the region produces wool, lamb, beef and wine. Baynton is home to several wineries, and tourism has become an important component of the region's economy.

History 
Baynton is named after an early pioneer of the area, Dr. Thomas Baynton, whose extensive station was named 'Darlington', and although the original homestead no longer remains, Darlington remains a significant local property. The Baynton area was previously occupied by Aboriginal people, and was the approximate meeting point of three tribal areas including Dja Dja Wurrung, Taungurong, and Woiwurrung. The Tachylite deposits near Spring Hill and the Coliban River may have been important trade goods as stone artefacts from this material have been found around Victoria.

European settlement began in the 1830s with the arrival of Captain Sylvester Brown, who travelled overland with livestock from Sydney to set up an agricultural enterprise in Baynton.   His residence, however, was short-lived, and he was followed by a succession of landholders including Dr. Baynton, the Polhman brothers, Martin McKenna (first president of the Shire of Kyneton) and J.B. Thomson.

One notable event in the early history of Baynton was the passing of the Burke and Wills expedition in 1860, and the departure from Baynton was recorded by the expedition artist Ludwig Becker, whose sketch is housed at the State Library Victoria. Local resident J.B. Thomson alleged he joined Burke and Wills with the intention of travelling to northern Australia, but abandoned the party in Echuca, describing the expedition as 'reckless and bound to failure'.
Bushranger Ned Kelly is fabled to have stolen a horse from the public house opposite the Baynton Racecourse.   Local legend says the horse's owner, J.B. Thomson bet on a race with a stranger to the district, and when he won, they two went for a drink.   The stranger then stepped out to check his horse, but did not return, stealing the faster horse, and disappearing from the district.  He was later found to be none other than Ned Kelly.

Baynton township developed in the 1860s and the Post Office opened on 24 January 1867, closing in 1959.

Baynton today 
At its height as an identifiable town, Baynton was home to three schools, a church, two public houses and a cobbler shop.   Today only the Hall remains, and it is used for community meetings and events.   The Baynton Church, which was built in the late 1800s and rebuilt in the 1960s was destroyed in the Black Saturday bushfires of 2009, and will not be rebuilt.  Baynton remains a close knit agricultural community, with a variety of enterprises including sheep, cattle, wine production and commercial forestry.   The Baynton Hall, established in the early 1960s, is the home of the Baynton Film Society, and screens an Australian-based movie each year, on or around Australia Day.   The Baynton-Sidonia Landcare group is active in working toward sustainable land management in the region.
Due to the relative absence of subdivision in the Baynton area, it remains one of the most intact farming areas in the Macedon Ranges area.
April 2012 saw celebrations for the 50th anniversary of the Baynton Hall, and a book of the history of Baynton was launched at the 50th Anniversary celebrations.
Baynton has been recognised as 'possibly the most well signposted place which does not exist as a recognisable town' due to the number of prominent signs directing to Baynton.

People of note 
Thomas Alexander Browne, (who wrote under the pseudonym Rolf Boldrewood) was an early Australian writer, and author of the novel 'Robbery Under Arms'.  Thomas Browne was the son of Captain Sylvester Brown, and was a resident of Baynton as a young boy.  Walker Thomson, a member of the Australian forces in the South African War (1899–1902) was involved in the siege of Mafeking and became a friend of General Robert Baden-Powell was born and raised in Baynton.

References

Towns in Victoria (Australia)
Shire of Macedon Ranges